The men's 110 metres hurdles event at the 2022 African Championships in Athletics was held on 8 and 9 August in Port Louis, Mauritius.

Medalists

Results

Heats
Qualification: First 2 of each heat (Q) and the next 2 fastest (q) qualified for the final.

Wind:Heat 1: +2.8 m/s, Heat 2: +2.7 m/s, Heat 3: +3.3 m/s

Final
Wind: +4.8 m/s

References

2022 African Championships in Athletics
Sprint hurdles at the African Championships in Athletics